Pink Fairies are an English rock band initially active in the London (Ladbroke Grove) underground and psychedelic scene of the early 1970s. They promoted free music, drug use, and anarchy, and often performed impromptu gigs and other stunts, such as playing for nothing outside the gates at the Bath and Isle of Wight pop festivals in 1970,  as well as appearing at Phun City, the first Glastonbury and many other free festivals including Windsor and Trentishoe.

History

Paul Rudolph incarnation, 1969–1972
The group was formed after the three musicians from the Deviants (Paul Rudolph, guitar and vocals, Duncan Sanderson, bass and Russell Hunter, born Barry Russell Hunter, drums), sacked their singer and leader Mick Farren during a disastrous tour of the West Coast of the United States. Prior to the tour these musicians had collaborated on the Think Pink solo album by Twink, former drummer of the Pretty Things. Most of the musicians involved were members of a drinking club called the Pink Fairies Motorcycle Club and All-Star Rock and Roll Band, taken from a story written by Jamie Mandelkau.  While the former Deviants' sidemen were still stranded in America after the tour, Twink, Farren and former Tyrannosaurus Rex percussionist Steve Peregrin Took had used the Pink Fairies name for various activities, including one shambolic gig in Manchester (with Farren on vocals, Took on guitar, Twink on drums and his girlfriend Sally Meltzer also known as "Silver Darling" on keyboards) and the recording of Farren's solo album, Mona – The Carnivorous Circus. Within a few months Twink had left, followed by Farren, by which point Took had renamed the embryonic band Shagrat. In February 1970, Twink recruited the remaining Deviants to a new Pink Fairies line-up. Took meanwhile continued with Shagrat as a vehicle for his own songs, and the two bands would appear as separate acts at the Phun City festival that summer.

Their music was upbeat good-time rock and roll, often jamming on the Beatles' "Tomorrow Never Knows", the Ventures' "Walk, Don't Run (instrumental)", "Ghost Riders in the Sky" and other standards. Their sets climaxed with the lengthy "Uncle Harry's Last Freakout", essentially an amalgam of old Deviants riffs that included extended guitar and double drum solos. They were closely associated with the UK underground, being based in the Ladbroke Grove scene and playing festivals, benefits and free concerts. The band had strong connections with Farren's home town Worthing, playing gigs for the Worthing Workshop. These included an appearance on a float in the Worthing Rotary Club Carnival Procession and a free open-air concert in Beach House Park. Playing for free in June 1970 outside the Bath Festival, they encountered another Ladbroke Grove based band, Hawkwind, who shared similar interests in music and recreational activities. A friendship developed which would lead to the two bands becoming running partners and performing as Pinkwind. Sensationalist coverage in the (Mick Farren edited) International Times solidified their rebel reputation.

Polydor Records commissioned the group to record a single, "The Snake" / "Do It", and were happy enough with the results to offer the group an album contract. The debut album Never Never Land was released in 1971. It featured live favourites "Uncle Harry's Last Freakout" and "Do It", but curiously omitted "The Snake". An appearance at 1971's Glastonbury Fair led to them being given one side of the Glastonbury Fayre various artists triple album. In July 1971, Twink left to travel to Morocco. The band continued as a three-piece, occasionally augmented by former The Move bassist Trevor Burton on guitar. They released their second album What a Bunch of Sweeties in 1972, which featured some contributions from Burton. On the album's release and with a promotional tour pending Rudolph departed, going on to play on albums for Robert Calvert and Brian Eno. He would eventually replace Lemmy in Hawkwind.

Larry Wallis incarnation, 1973–1978
Mick Wayne (born Michael Wayne, 1945, Hull, Yorkshire and died 26 June 1994), was Rudolph's replacement, having recorded with Sanderson, Hunter and Steve Peregrin Took on sessions for Took at Olympic Studios, and later on loose sessions (along with sundry other underground musicians) in Took's flat in the basement of manager Tony Secunda's office, the fruits of which were released by Cleopatra Records in 1995. Feeling that Took's exceptionally heavy drug consumption would not make him a going concern, the remaining three instead formed a new version of The Pink Fairies (much to Took's subsequent chagrin), releasing the single "Well, Well, Well" / "Hold On", as well as doing a radio session for BBC Radio One.

However, Sanderson and Hunter became unhappy with the musical direction Wayne was taking the band. They convinced Larry Wallis, who had played with Steve Took's Shagrat and later UFO, to join the group as a second guitarist. Shortly after, they sacked Wayne, passing songwriting and singing duties onto Wallis. This new three piece then recorded the 1973 album Kings of Oblivion. Out of contract with Polydor, the band continued touring to a decreasing audience, until finally calling it a day. Wallis went on to join Lemmy in the first incarnation of Motörhead, then became the in-house record producer for Stiff Records. Sanderson joined The Lightning Raiders. Hunter left the music business.

Ted Carroll, head of Chiswick Records, organized a one-off reunion concert at The Roundhouse on 13 July 1975, featuring all five previous major members of the group (released in 1982 as Live at the Roundhouse 1975). Following this concert, Wallis, Sanderson and Hunter decided to give the Pink Fairies another try. This line up eventually gave numerous 'farewell tours' before disbanding. After a period of inactivity they entered the burgeoning punk scene as one of the few 'hairy' bands revered by the new guard. Recruiting former Chilli Willi and the Red Hot Peppers guitarist Martin Stone, they toured and released the single "Between the Lines" / "Spoiling for a Fight" on Stiff Records but, with little interest being shown in them, they once again split up. Rudolph and Wallis resumed playing for Farren in 1977/78, releasing the EP Screwed Up as The Deviants again on Stiff, but Rudolph returned to his native Canada prior to the recording of 1978's Vampires Stole My Lunch Money and follow up single "Broken Statue".

1980s and 1990s
In the early 1980s, Wallis, Sanderson and drummer George Butler (ex-Lightning Raiders) recorded and played live, the albums Previously Unreleased (1982) and The Deviants' Human Garbage (live 1984) being released. The band went under many names including The Police Cars, The Police Sleighs, The Donut Dunkers Of Death and finally The Love Pirates Of Doom, the most settled line up being Wallis, Sanderson, Butler and second guitarist Andy Colquhoun (ex-Warsaw Pakt & Tanz Der Youth).

In 1987, Jake Riviera, head of Demon Records, offered a recording contract for a reformed Pink Fairies. Of the five group members, Paul Rudolph was not involved, so the second guitarist position was taken up by Andy Colquhoun, who had previously played alongside Wallis. This band released the album Kill 'Em and Eat 'Em and toured following a sell-out show and London's Town & Country Club before once again splitting up in 1988. After Twink's ignominious departure they had carried on until Wallis too left at which time the remaining members toured and recorded as Flying Colours. An archive live album Chinese Cowboys: Live 1987 was issued in Japan in 2005 on Captain Trip Records.

Following this period the magazine UHCK (Uncle Harry's City Kids - run initially by Jeff Holmes and later by Tim Rundall) collaborated with the band to produce two tape releases (Silence Of The Hams & Son Of Ham) and two CDs (Son Of Ham extended version & Hogwatch) for subscribers, all featuring entirely unreleased music by members of the band in various side projects (the Deviants, Lightning Raiders, etc.), radio sessions and specially written material. In common with many 'official' Pink Fairies releases the artwork was by the late underground cartoonist Edward J. Barker (I.T., Nasty Tales) famed for his Largactalites cartoons and his pig and crow caricatures. Much of the magazine was actually written by ex-band members and by longtime associate, road manager, 'wet nurse' and manager of Dingwalls, Boss Goodman, who went on to become a renowned chef, once cooking for US President Bill Clinton at the Portobello Gold.

In the mid-1990s Twink collaborated with Paul Rudolph and the pair recorded 1996's Pleasure Island and 1997's No Picture, released as the Pink Fairies on Twink's own label. Twink also issued a plethora of albums featuring outtakes, alternative versions, BBC sessions and live material including: The Golden Years 1969-1971, Do It, Live at Weeley Festival 1971 and Mandies and Mescaline Round at Uncle Harry's (1998).

21st century
During the early 2000s, Polydor remastered and released their Pink Fairies back catalogue with bonus cuts, and issued the sampler albums Master Series and Up the Pinks: An Introduction.

The Kings of Oblivion line-up (Wallis, Sanderson, Hunter) were scheduled to play at one-off gig on 22 January 2007 at the Roundhouse, London and record a BBC session for Stuart Maconie's Freakzone radio programme, but activities were cancelled at the last minute due to ill-health. In 2007, the biography Keep it Together! Cosmic Boogie with the Deviants and Pink Fairies by Rich Deakin, Mick Farren's webmaster, was published by Headpress. In September 2009, the What a Bunch of Sweeties line-up (Rudolph, Sanderson, Hunter) re-united in the studio to record a new version of "Do It" for the various artists CD Portobello Shuffle: A Testimonial To Boss Goodman And Tribute To The Deviants & Pink Fairies. The CD was a find-raiser for Boss Goodman, who was suffering from the after-effects of a stroke, and who died on 22 March 2018.

In 2011, Farren and Colquhoun returned to the UK from Los Angeles after nearly 20 years exile. They teamed up with the rhythm section of Hunter and Sanderson, along with second guitarist Tim Rundall and percussionist Jaki Windmill, for a number of appearances. This line up performed on the 'Spirit of 71' stage at the 2011 Glastonbury Festival - 40 years after the Pink Fairies' previous appearance at that event - under the name 'Mick Farren & The Last Men Standing'. Without Rundall, they later performed as The Deviants until Farren's death in 2013.

In 2014, the Pink Fairies reformed with a line-up of Russell Hunter, Duncan Sanderson, Andy Colquhoun, Jaki Windmill and second drummer George Butler. Initially announcing two dates - The Robin 2 in Bilston on 15 May and 100 Club in London on 17 May - more dates were later added up to October 2015. A new album called Naked Radio was released after a Pledgemusic campaign ending on 12 February 2017. George Butler died in January 2018.

Paul Rudolph completed recordings with drummer Lucas Fox and bass player Alan Davey in Austin, Texas, to be released as a Pink Fairies album on Cleopatra Records in 2018. One track appeared on the 2017 compilation Halloween Garage Blues. The LP Resident Reptiles was released on August 24, 2018.

Larry Wallis died on 19 September 2019, and Duncan Sanderson died just two months later on 20 November 2019. Tim Rundall died in January 2022.

Discography

Albums
1971 – Never Never Land (Polydor) – Rudolph; Sanderson; Hunter; Twink
1972 – What a Bunch of Sweeties (Polydor) – Rudolph; Sanderson; Hunter; Burton - UK No. 48
1973 – Kings of Oblivion (Polydor) – Wallis; Sanderson; Hunter
1987 – Kill 'Em and Eat 'Em (Demon) – Wallis; Colquhoun; Sanderson; Hunter; Twink
1996 – Pleasure Island (Twink Records) – Twink; Rudolph
1997 – No Picture (Twink Records) – Twink; Rudolph
2017 – Naked Radio (Gonzo Music) – Colquhoun; Sanderson; Hunter; Butler; Windmill
2018 – Resident Reptiles (Purple Pyramid) – Rudolph; Davey; Fox

EPs
1978 - Twink and the Fairies (Chiswick) – Twink; Sanderson - consisting of the tracks "Do It '77", "Psychedelic Punkeroo" and "Enter The Diamonds"
1984 – Previously Unreleased (Big Beat) – Wallis; Sanderson; Butler - recorded 1982

Compilation albums
1975 - Flashback (Polydor)
1999 - Live at the Roundhouse / Previously Unreleased / Do It '77 (Big Beat)
1999 – Master Series (Universal)
2002 – Up the Pinks – An Introduction to Pink Fairies (Polydor)
2021 – Duo Up (Explore Rights Management Ltd via Cherry Red)

Singles
1971 - "The Snake" / "Do It" (Polydor) – Rudolph; Sanderson; Hunter; Twink
1972 - "Pigs of Uranus" / "I Saw Her Standing There" (German Polydor release) Rudolph; Sanderson; Hunter 
1973 - "Well, Well, Well" / "Hold On"  (Polydor) – Wayne; Sanderson; Hunter
1976 - "Between the Lines" / "Spoiling for a Fight" (Stiff) – Wallis; Stone; Sanderson; Hunter

Live albums
1982 – Live at the Roundhouse 1975 (Big Beat) – Wallis; Rudolph; Sanderson; Hunter; Twink
1998 - The Golden Years: 1969–1971 (Cleopatra Records) – Rudolph; Sanderson; Hunter; Twink (live, BBC sessions, Twink solo material)
1998 - Mescaline and Mandies Round at Uncle Harry's (NMC) – Rudolph; Sanderson; Hunter; Twink; Burton (BBC sessions, live)
1999 - Do It! (Total Energy) – Rudolph; Sanderson; Hunter; Twink (live, Twink solo material)
1999 - Live at Weeley 1971 (Get Back) – Rudolph; Sanderson; Hunter (live)
2005 - Chinese Cowboys (Captain Trip) – Wallis; Colquhoun; Sanderson; Hunter; Twink (live 1987)
2008 - Finland Freakout 1971 Major League Productions (MLP) - Rudolph; Sanderson; Hunter (live)

Band members

Timeline

References

External links
 Twink's  Pink Fairies pages
 Larry Wallis' Pink Fairies website (via Archive.org)
 Phil Franks Digital Archive  The Pink Fairies
 UHCK History of the World Part Two story of the Pink Fairies.
 
 Current Pink Fairies website

English psychedelic rock music groups
Musical groups established in 1969
Musical groups from London
Protopunk groups
Stiff Records artists
Polydor Records artists
Freak scene musicians